Senator Otis may refer to:

George L. Otis (1829–1882), Minnesota State Senate
Harrison Gray Otis (politician) (1765–1848), U.S. Senator from Massachusetts
James Otis (New York politician) (1836–1898), New York State Senate
John Otis (Maine politician) (1801–1856), Maine State Senate